Bennett Thrasher LLP is a certified public accounting and consulting firm headquartered in Atlanta, Georgia that provides tax, audit, advisory and business process outsourcing services to businesses and high net worth individuals. The firm has 51 partners and more than 350 professionals, and is affiliated with BT Wealth Management, LLC and BT Family Office. Bennett Thrasher is also a member of Leading Edge Alliance and DFK International, which are worldwide associations of independent accounting and consulting firms.

Bennett Thrasher was founded in 1980 in Atlanta, Georgia, by Rick Bennett and Ken Thrasher.

Services
 Advisory & Interim Services
 Business Tax Planning & Consulting
 Corporate Investigations
 Credits & Incentives
 Disputes Resolution & Forensics
 Employee Benefit Plans
 Financial Reporting & Assurance
 Individual Tax Planning & Consulting
 Insurance Claims
 International Tax
 Mergers & Acquisitions
 Outsourced Accounting
 Risk Advisory
 SOC Audit
 State & Local Tax
 Tax Controversy
 Tax Planning & Consulting
 Technology Services
 Transfer Pricing
 Trust & Estate Planning
 Valuation
 Value Acceleration & Exit Planning

Industries

 Construction
 Entertainment
 Healthcare
 High Net Worth Individuals 
 Hospitality
 Insurance
 International
 Manufacturing & Distribution
 Not-for-Profit
 Private Equity & Investment Companies
 Real Estate
 Technology

References

Accounting firms of the United States
Organizations based in Atlanta